Quincy Williams (born August 28, 1996) is an American football linebacker for the New York Jets of the National Football League (NFL). He played college football at Murray State and was drafted by the Jacksonville Jaguars in the third round of the 2019 NFL Draft.

He is the older brother of Quinnen Williams, a defensive lineman who also plays for the New York Jets.

College career
Quincy Williams played multiple positions at Murray State University. His freshman year he redshirted in 2014. In 2015 he played in 11 games with three starts. He finished the season with 31 tackles and a pass breakup. In 2016 he played in 10 game with three starts with 32 tackles, 13 solo with one pass breakup. His senior year he played in all 11 games and finished the season with 78 tackles and two interceptions, one being a pick six.

Professional career

Jacksonville Jaguars
Williams was drafted by the Jacksonville Jaguars in the third round with the 98th overall pick in the 2019 NFL Draft. The Jaguars previously acquired this selection in a trade that sent Dante Fowler to the Los Angeles Rams.

As a rookie, Williams was named a starting outside linebacker to begin the season. He played in 11 games with eight starts before being placed on injured reserve on December 11, 2019. He finished the season with 48 tackles.

On September 8, 2020, Williams was placed on injured reserve. He was designated to return from injured reserve on September 30, and began practicing with the team again. He was activated on October 10, 2020.

On August 31, 2021, Williams was waived by the Jaguars.

New York Jets
On September 1, 2021, the New York Jets claimed Williams off waivers.

On October 3, 2021, the Williams siblings became the first pair of brothers with sacks in the same game for the same team since sacks became an official stat in 1982. They combined for 19 tackles in the Jets' 27-24 overtime victory over the Tennessee Titans.

On August 20, 2022, Williams was fined $10,609 for a late hit he made on Jalen Hurts during the first preseason game against the Philadelphia Eagles.

On March 15, 2023, Williams signed a three-year, $18 million contract extension with the Jets.

References

External links
Murray State Racers bio
 

1996 births
Living people
Players of American football from Birmingham, Alabama
American football linebackers
American football safeties
Murray State Racers football players
Jacksonville Jaguars players
New York Jets players